Lawrence John Romano (born July 31, 1963) is an American film and television actor.
Born in Mount Vernon, New York, he was a regular on NYPD Blue and the sitcom The King of Queens, on which he played Richie Iannucci. He played First Base in the motion picture Lock Up. He had a lead role in the NBC sitcom Kristin as Aldo Bonnadonna; the short-lived sitcom aired only six episodes before being canceled.

Romano made a cameo appearance in Out for Justice. In 1996, he played Tino Zapatti in the film City Hall and played a minor role in the film Sleepers. In 1997, he had a brief role playing opposite Al Pacino in the role of Benjamin "Lefty" Ruggerio's son in Donnie Brasco, and appeared in the 1998 Terrence Malick film The Thin Red Line. He also appeared in the 2010 film The Ascent, as well as in the 2015 film Laugh Killer Laugh.

Early life and education 
Romano was born Lawrence John Romano on July 31, 1963, in Mount Vernon, New York. He is of Italian-American descent. Romano studied acting at the Lee Strasberg Theatre and Film Institute (originally the Lee Strasberg Theatre Institute), HB Studios and Method and Miesner. He studied screenwriting and playwright work with Ron Peterson, Stuart Brown, and Richard Walter.

Romano began his acting career appearing in local New York Off Broadway plays.  He received his Screen Actors Guild (SAG) card on Ridley Scott's Black Rain. Romano played the minor role of Joe Zeppi. Romano portrayed Madonna's boyfriend in the music video "Oh Father."  Larry is not related to Ray Romano of Everybody Loves Raymond fame.

Music career 
In the early 1990s, Romano formed the Rock Band "DEFICIT" with friends from the Bronx. He wrote and recorded the song "Rock in the Bronx" which was aired by the local TV station Madison Square Garden Network. The introduction to both videos is by New York Yankee broadcaster, Mel Allen. "Rock in the Bronx" was the No. 1 most requested song on NYC Radio Station Z-100 in 1993.

Filmography

References

External links 

1963 births
Living people
American male film actors
American male television actors
People from Staten Island
American people of Italian descent
Male actors from New York (state)